Prosopochaeta is a genus of parasitic flies in the family Tachinidae.

Species
Prosopochaeta anomala Aldrich, 1934
Prosopochaeta caliginosa Cortés & Campos, 1971
Prosopochaeta fidelis (Reinhard, 1967)
Prosopochaeta nitidiventris Macquart, 1851
Prosopochaeta setosa (Townsend, 1915)

References

Diptera of South America
Dexiinae
Tachinidae genera
Taxa named by Pierre-Justin-Marie Macquart